Kawazu (written: 河津 or 川津) is a Japanese surname. Notable people with the surname include:

, Japanese video game designer
, Japanese long jumper
, Japanese footballer
, Japanese voice actor
, Japanese actor

Japanese-language surnames